

158001–158100 

|-id=092
| 158092 Frasercain ||  || Fraser Cain (born 1971), Canadian engineer, book and magazine author, YouTuber and astronomy popularizer, and publisher of Universe Today || 
|}

158101–158200 

|-bgcolor=#f2f2f2
| colspan=4 align=center | 
|}

158201–158300 

|-id=222
| 158222 Manicolas ||  || Marie-Annick Nicolas (born 1956), Swiss violinist, born in Le Creusot, France, location of the Le Creusot Observatory  where this minor planet was discovered || 
|-id=241
| 158241 Yutonagatomo ||  || Yuto Nagatomo (born 1986), Japanese football player for the J-League's Tokyo Football Club || 
|}

158301–158400 

|-id=329
| 158329 Stevekent ||  || Stephen Kent (born 1952), American astronomer with the Sloan Digital Sky Survey who studies the structure of galaxies and clusters || 
|}

158401–158500 

|-id=472
| 158472 Tiffanyfinley ||  || Tiffany J. Finley (born 1976) is a principal engineer at the Southwest Research Institute. She served as the Science Operations Center Manager for the New Horizons Mission to Pluto. || 
|}

158501–158600 

|-id=520
| 158520 Ricardoferreira ||  || Ricardo Ferreira (born 1928), Brazilian physicochemist || 
|-id=589
| 158589 Snodgrass ||  || Colin Snodgrass (born 1981), British astronomer at the European Southern Observatory || 
|}

158601–158700 

|-id=623
| 158623 Perali ||  || Mirella Perali (born 1931), Italian amateur astronomer, author of several biographies of scientists and essays on the interplay between astronomy and classical literature || 
|-id=657
| 158657 Célian || 2003 EF || Célian Hernandez (born 2010), the second son of astronomer Michel Hernandez, one of the discoverers at the Observatory of Saint-Veran in France || 
|}

158701–158800 

|-bgcolor=#f2f2f2
| colspan=4 align=center | 
|}

158801–158900 

|-id=899
| 158899 Malloryvale || 2004 QO || Mallory Vale (born 1986), observer at the Table Mountain Observatory in California who made astrometric measurements of near-Earth objects and comets || 
|}

158901–159000 

|-id=913
| 158913 Kreider ||  || Christian Kreider (born 1957), French amateur astronomer || 
|}

References 

158001-159000